James L. Totten was an American politician who served as the Speaker of the Mississippi House of Representatives between 1844 and 1846. 

Totten served as the sheriff of Carroll County, Tennessee between 1822 and 1832. Between 1825 and 1831, Totten also served as a clerk of the Gibson County Circuit Court.
Totten served one term in the Tennessee Senate between 1835 and 1837, representing Dyer, Gibson and Carroll Counties.
Totten served one term in the Mississippi House of Representatives from 1844 to 1846, representing Marshall County. During the term, Totten served as Speaker of the House.

References

Members of the Mississippi House of Representatives
Speakers of the Mississippi House of Representatives
Tennessee state senators
19th-century American politicians